Cetate is a commune in Dolj County, Oltenia, Romania. It is composed of two villages, Cetate and Moreni. Its population is 5,368 (2011), of which 4,781 in Cetate proper and 587 in Moreni.

In January 1854, during the Crimean War, Cetate was the scene of a battle between a Russian garrison there and a Turkish army based in Calafat. The battle was inconclusive, though the Turks were unable to capture the town.

References

Communes in Dolj County
Localities in Oltenia
Populated places on the Danube
River ports of Romania